Omolio is a village and a community of the Agia municipality. Before the 2011 local government reform it was a part of the municipality of Evrymenes. The 2011 census recorded 606 inhabitants in the village. The community of Omolio covers an area of 22.38 km2. The site of ancient Homolium can be found within the bounds of the community.

Geography
The village is located on a plain by the northern slopes of Mount Ossa, less than 1 km away from Pineios river.

Population
According to the 2011 census, the population of the settlement of Omolio was 606 people, a decrease of almost 13% compared with the population of the previous census of 2001.

See also
 List of settlements in the Larissa regional unit

References

Populated places in Larissa (regional unit)